Carly Simon: Live at Grand Central is a 1995 concert special that aired on Lifetime Television. Performed in the middle of New York City's Grand Central Terminal, the surprise concert was a prelude to Simon's first concert tour in 14 years. It featured Simon and a live band performing the majority of her Letters Never Sent album, as well as some of her hits such as "That's the Way I've Always Heard It Should Be", "Anticipation", "Legend in Your Own Time", "Haven't Got Time for the Pain", "Jesse", "Coming Around Again", and "Let the River Run". It was directed by English music video and film director Nigel Dick.

For this special, Simon was nominated for two CableACE Awards: Performance in a Music Special and Original Song for "Touched by the Sun", winning for the latter.

Production and release history 
It was Jackie Onassis's idea for Simon to perform in Grand Central. Simon wrote the song "Touched by the Sun" for Onassis, which originally appeared on Simon's album Letters Never Sent (1994). The surprise performance "stopped commuters in their tracks", and aired on Lifetime on May 21, 1995. Simon was also featured in an episode of the Lifetime original series Intimate Portrait, which was broadcast the same night.

Live at Grand Central was released on home video on December 12, 1995. The concert was restored and re-released on January 27, 2023 on Blu-ray, Vinyl and CD, and can be purchased through Simon's official website. Alongside the announcement, a video of "Like a River" from the concert was released, which was not featured on its original release.

Track listings 
All tracks composed by Carly Simon; except where indicated.

Original 1995 release 
 "Touched by the Sun"
 "Haven't Got Time for the Pain" (Simon/Jacob Brackman)
 "Letters Never Sent" (Simon/Brackman)
 "I've Got to Have You" (Kris Kristofferson)
 "Anticipation"
 "Halfway 'Round the World"
 "Legend in Your Own Time"
 "Jesse" (Simon/Mike Mainieri)
 "De Bat (Fly in Me Face)"
 "Coming Around Again"
 "Davy"
 "That's the Way I've Always Heard It Should Be" (Simon/Brackman)
 "Let the River Run"
 "We Have No Secrets"

Revised 2023 re-release 
 "Touched by the Sun"
 "Anticipation"
 "I've Got to Have You" (Kris Kristofferson)
 "We Have No Secrets"
 "Haven't Got Time for the Pain" (Simon/Jacob Brackman)
 "Jesse" (Simon/Mike Mainieri)
 "That's the Way I've Always Heard It Should Be" (Simon/Brackman)
 "Letters Never Sent" (Simon/Brackman)
 "Legend in Your Own Time"
 "De Bat (Fly in Me Face)"
 "Davy"
 "Halfway 'Round the World"
 "Like a River"
 "Coming Around Again"
 "Let the River Run"

Awards

Live album

Live at Grand Central was made available for the first time on vinyl and CD on January 27, 2023, making it Simon's second live album, following Greatest Hits Live in 1988.

A review from Riff magazine stated: "This new release of Live at Grand Central captures [Simon's] command of the stage beautifully, and the remixing does it the justice it deserves."

Track listing
Credits adapted from the album's liner notes.

Personnel
Teese Gohl – music director, keyboards
Rick Marotta – drums
Doug Wimbish – bass
Peter Calo – guitar
Dirk Ziff – guitar
Mick Rossi – keyboards
Mindy Jostyn – violin
Eric Bazilian – mandolin
Marc Cohn – backing vocals
Jerry Barnes – backing vocals
Katreese Barnes – backing vocals
Curtis King – backing vocals

References

External links 
 Carly Simon's official website

Live video albums
1995 video albums
Carly Simon live albums